Leo James Bird (17 September 1908 – 6 August 1990) was an Australian rules footballer who played with Collingwood and Fitzroy in the Victorian Football League (VFL).

Notes

External links 

Leo Bird's profile at Collingwood Forever

1908 births
1990 deaths
Australian rules footballers from Victoria (Australia)
Collingwood Football Club players
Fitzroy Football Club players